Thomas Whitaker Trenchard (December 13, 1863 – July 23, 1942) was an American lawyer and a justice of the New Jersey Supreme Court between 1906 and 1941.

Trenchard was born on December 13, 1863 in Centreton, Pittsgrove Township, Salem County, New Jersey, the son of William B. and Marie G. Trenchard. He graduated South Jersey Institute in 1882 and was  admitted to bar in 1886. He practiced at Bridgeton, New Jersey, where he also acted as  City Solicitor from 1892 to 1899. He was Member House of Assembly in  1889 and Republican presidential elector in 1896. He married Harriet M. Manning on November 17, 1891. They resided in Bridgeton.

He was appointed law judge of Cumberland County by Governor of New Jersey Foster McGowan Voorhees in 1899 and reappointed by Governor Murphy in 1904. He was appointed Justice of Supreme Court on June 8, 1906 to fill a vacancy and for full term on January 15, 1907. He is well known for being the presiding judge in the high-profile trial of Richard Hauptmann for the Lindbergh kidnapping. He retired in 1941.

He died on July 23, 1942 at his home in Trenton and is buried at the Old Broad Street Presbyterian Church and Cemetery in Bridgeton.

In popular culture
Trenchard was portrayed by Walter Pidgeon in the 1976 TV movie The Lindbergh Kidnapping Case and by Gerald McRaney in J. Edgar (2011), both depicting the Lindbergh trial.

See also
List of justices of the Supreme Court of New Jersey
New Jersey Court of Errors and Appeals
Courts of New Jersey

References

1863 births
1942 deaths
New Jersey lawyers
Justices of the Supreme Court of New Jersey
People from Bridgeton, New Jersey
People from Pittsgrove Township, New Jersey
Politicians from Trenton, New Jersey